Schweigen-Rechtenbach is a municipality in Südliche Weinstraße district, in Rhineland-Palatinate, western Germany.

Geography
Schweigen-Rechtenbach is located at the southern end, marked by the imposing Deutsches Weintor, of the German Wine Route. The principal route no longer passes through the "Weintor", but has been diverted round it. Continuing in a southerly direction from the municipality the principal route continues to Wissembourg, first crossing the current frontier between Germany and France.

History
Schweigen-Rechtenbach was created, as part of a larger programme of local government boundary reforms in the area, on 7 June 1969 through the fusion of Schweigen and Rechtenbach, both of which had previously been administratively independent.

References

Municipalities in Rhineland-Palatinate
Palatinate Forest